Dadra is associated with the Hindustani classical music of the Indian subcontinent.

Dadra tala
This is a Hindustani classical tala (rhythmic cycle), consisting of six beats in two equal divisions of three.  The most commonly accepted theka or basic pattern for this tala is dha dhi na, dha tu na. There is a higher emphasis laid on the first swar in comparison the following two, that is, dha - higher emphasis following dhi na and again a higher emphasis on dha following tu na.

Theka of Dadra Tala

मात्रा भाग : 3-3.  
धा धिं ना - धा तीं ना  
It has a characteristic pattern of bols (theka).

This can also be shown using the following figure

Dadra (genre)
In this context dadra is a light classical vocal form in Hindustani classical music, mostly performed in Agra and in Bundelkhand region. It was originally accompanied by dadra tala (from where the term for the genre was borrowed), but later dadra compositions are often found in other light talas (such as keherwa).

The peculiarity of Dadra genre is that the Sthayi is in Braj Bhasha while the  Antara is sometimes in Urdu. It is one of the illustrations of how cultures have amalgamated and coexisted in Indian classical music.

There have been some Bollywood songs as well based on the same for instance Madan Mohan composition -Lag Jaa Gale, a song from the movie Woh Kaun Thi.

See also
Hindustani classical music

References

External links
Article about dadra

Hindustani music terminology
Indian styles of music